Sitkum Glacier is located on the west slopes of Glacier Peak in the U.S. state of Washington. As is true with all the glaciers found on Glacier Peak, Sitkum Glacier is retreating. Sitkum Glacier is immediately south of Scimitar Glacier.

See also
List of glaciers in the United States

References

Glaciers of Glacier Peak
Glaciers of Washington (state)